Kermia bulbosa is an extinct species of sea snail, a marine gastropod mollusk in the family Raphitomidae.

Description
The length reaches 2.8 mm, the diameter 1.1 mm.

Distribution
Fossils of this extinct species were found in Early Miocene strata of the Kerala Basin in South West India

References

bulbosa
Gastropods described in 2013